Music Muscle is the fourteenth studio album by Japanese singer-songwriter Maki Ohguro. It was released on 5 December 2018 under the Being Inc. label. It's her first studio album for the first time in 8 years. From this album, Ohguro works with music production team from the Being, the label which she debuted.

This album was released in two formats: regular 2-disc edition and limited first press edition with DVD. The DVD disc includes music videoclips and making footage for the songs Music Musle, Lie Lie Lie, My Will, Latitude and Zoom Up.

Promotion

Singles
This album consist of eleven previously released singles, which thirteen of them were released as a digital singles and one single was released in CD format.

Digital single Higher Higher was released on 10 August 2016. On the same release day, Maki announced her comeback to the music industry. The single served as a television commercial song to the Mizuno Corporation's "Wave Rider 20".

Album track My Will was released in 2016 as a part of the compilation album Greatest Hits 1991-2016 ~All Singles +~ (along with Higher Higher) and served as a theme song to the 10th season of the TV Asahi television drama of Kasouken no Onna.

Compact disc single Lie Lie Lie was released on 27 September 2017, it become her only single to be released in such format as of February 2020. The single served as an opening theme to the anime television series Detective Conan. The coupling track Revenge has served as a theme song to the Chinese animated series Master of Skill. The single was commercially successful: it debuted at number 20 on the Oricon single weekly charts and charted 4 weeks.

The following digitals singles in various time periods. Two 2017 singles: "Latitude" and "Zoom Up" released simultaneously on 26 October 2017. Latitude served as a theme song and Zoom up at an insert theme song in the theatrical movie Shashin Kôshien 0.5 Byô no Natsu. Another two 2018 singles: "Because You" and "Crush&Rush" were from 27 May 2018. From June to October 2018, the release pace has changed to the one digital single per month, mainly to promote the release of Music Muscle album.

Commercial performance
The album reached #30 in its first week and charted for 4 weeks.

Track listing

Disc 1: Fighting Muscle

Disc 2: Resting Muscle

References

Being Inc. albums
Japanese-language albums
2018 albums
Maki Ohguro albums